Comb Law is a hill in the Lowther Hills range, part of the Southern Uplands of Scotland. The second lowest Donald in the area south of the A702 road, it is surrounded on most sides by tracks or roads and there are various routes to the summit, but the easiest ascent is from the Daer Reservoir.

References

Mountains and hills of the Southern Uplands
Mountains and hills of Dumfries and Galloway
Donald mountains